A bicycle highway, also known as a cycling superhighway, fast cycle route or bike freeway, is an informal name for a bicycle path that is meant for long-distance traffic. There is no official definition of a bicycle highway. The characteristics of a cycle motorway mentioned by authorities and traffic experts include an absence of single-level intersections with motorized traffic, a better road surface (preferably asphalt or concrete) and the absence of traffic lights. Bicycle highways are mentioned in connection with traffic jam. Owing to higher average speeds than normal cycling infrastructure, they provide an alternative to the car in commuter traffic. Often a cycle motorway follows the route of a railway or other linear infrastructure.

Definition

Netherlands
In the Netherlands the bicycle highway is not defined in the RVV. However, there is a guideline for developing bicycle highways. The Dutch Ministry of Transport, Public Works and Water Management describes the bicycle highway as a long cycle path without crossings, on which cyclists can travel long distances. By building bicycle highways, the government hopes, among other things, to promote the use of bicycles for commuter traffic and thus prevent traffic jams.

In the Netherlands, the following people can use a bike freeway:

 Cyclists: 'ordinary' cyclists, recumbents, cargo bikes, velomobiles, pedelecs
 Riders of a motorized bicycle with a maximum speed of 25 km / hour
 Depending on the location also mopeds, with a maximum speed of 40 km / hour
 Pedestrians if pavement and footpath are missing
 Riders of a segway
 Drivers of a disabled vehicle. However, a maximum speed of 30 km / hour applies to them.

Belgium
In Belgium this type of cycle path is not mentioned in the Road Code. In Flanders, the provincial governments and the Flemish Region take the initiative for the construction of bicycle highways. At the Flemish regional level there are no guidelines on the design of cycle highways, only on 'normal' cycle paths. In practice, there are differences between the provinces. This is because the authorized Flemish departments (Department of Policy) and agencies are organized per province, which results in different emphasis per region, and are under the jurisdiction of the provincial governments. They are called a bicycle highway because of the route signaling. The Flemish and Brussels bicycle highways are numbered and indicated as such.

There is no maximum speed (for cyclists), unless indicated otherwise.

Features

Cost of construction
The cost of building a bicycle super highway depends on many things, but is usually between €300.000/km (for a wide dedicated cycle track) and €800.000/km (when complex civil engineering structures are needed).

Lane width
In the Netherlands:
 The minimum desired width of the bicycle lane is 2.00 meters on the bicycle highway. The absolute minimum width of the bicycle lane is 1.50 meters.

In Belgium:

 Antwerp: double direction bicycle paths must be at least 3 meters wide
 Flemish Brabant: double-direction bicycle paths must be 4 meters wide (at least 3 meters), single-direction bicycle paths 2.5 meters (at least 2 meters) 
 East Flanders: double-direction cycle paths must be at least 3 meters wide.

Bike freeways by country

Belgium 
The bicycle highway network of the Flemish and Brussels regions are managed by a consortium made up of the five Flemish Provinces and the Brussels-Capital Region. In the Brussels-Capital Region, the 'F' is replaced by a 'C', with the route's numbering staying identical. Both regions use the same signage and signposts made up of a stylised light blue triangle; only the 'F' letter becoming a 'C' in Brussels territory.

Brussels-Capital Region 

Furthermore, in and around the Brussels Region, four circular bike freeways: C0, CR1, CR2 and CR20 loop around the city. The CR0 and CR20 numbering is related to the ring way next to which they were built: R0 for the Brussels Ring, R20 for the Small Ring.

Flemish Region 
Within Flanders, a network of bike freeways, consisting of around 120 routes, is being rolled out, connecting all Flemish cities.

The whole network will consist of 2700 km bike freeways, connecting all Flemish cities. As of 2018, around 1500 km was completed. Most Flemish cities are therefore already connected by bike freeways or a temporary alternative. It's therefore possible to travel around the whole Flemish region by bike from city to city with a nearly absence (or at least minimum) of single-level intersections with motorized traffic ("without a single stop"). Ghent is for example connected by bike freeways to almost all neighbouring Flemish cities (Bruges, Deinze, Kortrijk, Roeselare, Oudenaarde, Antwerp,...).

As of 2022, 38 projects for constructions of parts of these cycle highways were under construction. 50 projects were in preparation. 8000 cyclists per hour were counted at some places.

Many bike freeways are purpose-built, with dedicated bicycle bridges and intersections or at least (two-way) bicycle paths. Many purpose-built bike freeways follow the route of the railway system. However, many existing towpaths along rivers and canals have also been integrated within this network of bike freeways as they often responded to the minimum requirements with only minor adaptations.

Wallonia 
Therefore, the region is not implementing additional bike freeways, even though the RAVeL network is generally also open to pedestrians and sometimes horse riders, and the speed is limited to 30 km/h.

Netherlands
The first Dutch route opened in 2004 between Breda and Etten-Leur; many others have been added since then. In 2017 several bicycle superhighways were opened in the Arnhem-Nijmegen region, with the RijnWaalpad as the best example of this new type of cycling infrastructure.

Denmark
In Denmark there exists a network of long-distance and high-speed cycle paths connecting the suburban areas of Copenhagen with the city core. There are eight routes in operation in September 2018. There are plans of building 45 routes with a total length of 476 km by 2021 in the cities and municipalities of the Capitol Region of Denmark.

The first Danish route, C99, opened in 2012 between Vesterport Station in Vesterbro, Copenhagen and Albertslund, a western suburb. The route cost 13.4 million DKK (approx. 1.8M EUR) and is 17.5 km long, built with few stops and new paths away from traffic. “Service stations” with air pumps are located at regular intervals, and where the route must cross streets, handholds and running boards are provided so cyclists can wait without having to put their feet on the ground. Similar projects have since been built in Germany among other countries.

Germany
There are also bicycle highways and new plans in Germany to build bicycle highways, called Radschnellweg in German.

A 100 km long fast cycle route has been planned between the cities of Duisburg and Hamm, the first parts of which were completed in 2015, this includes a disused railway line.

In addition, there is a plan to connect Aachen via a 30 km-long cycle route with the Dutch town of Heerlen. This route is known as the Radschnellweg StädteRegion Aachen.

Sweden
Sweden's first bicycle highway was built in the municipality of Örebro in 2012. Bicycle highways was also built in 2018 in Umeå Municipality.

United Kingdom

In London, twelve new bicycle routes, dubbed Cycle Superhighways, were announced in 2008 by Mayor Ken Livingstone, with the aim of creating continuous cycle routes from outer London into and across central London by the end of 2012.

, only seven cycle superhighways were operational: CS1—CS3 and CS5—CS8.

United States
The United States Bicycle Route System (USBRS) is numbering bicycle routes including state bikeways.

One of the United States' first bicycle freeways is a portion of the Midtown Greenway in Minneapolis, Minnesota, completed between 2000 and 2004. For 3 miles, this section travels along a below-grade railroad corridor underneath 35 street bridges in addition to I-35W bridges, a pedestrian bridge, and a skyway. There is one intersection at 5th Ave, but the cross-traffic is required to stop for the bicycle freeway traffic. There's also a streetlight dedicated to bicyclists and pedestrians on the north side of the one-way Park Avenue bridge so that bicycle traffic can cross between the bike lane on the east side of Park Avenue and the ramp for the bike freeway on the west side of Park Avenue. This bicycle freeway cost over $36 million to complete all sections in 2007. Minneapolis also has other bicycle freeways that extend to neighboring suburbs from the Grand Rounds Scenic Byway.

Some bike paths are built alongside a freeway made for automobiles, a notable example being the I-275 Metro Trail, a bike path along Interstate 275 in Monroe, Wayne and Oakland counties in Michigan.

References

External links
 www.cyclehighways.eu
www.fietssnelwegf35.nl
 www.rijnwaalpad.nl
 www.fietssnelwegen.nl 
 www.fietssnelwegen.be
 Bicycle highways in Flanders